Stranger in Sacramento or Uno straniero a Sacramento is a 1965 Italian Spaghetti Western film directed by Sergio Bergonzelli. It was based on the novel I Will Kill You Tomorrow by Jim Murphy.

Cast
Mickey Hargitay as Mike Jordan
Enrico Bomba as Chris (as Steve Saint-Claire)
Mario Lanfranchi as Mill (as Johnny Jordan)
Giulio Marchetti as Sheriff Joe (as James Hill)
Florencia Silvero as Lisa (as Flo Silver)
Barbara Frey as Rona Barret
Big Matthews (as Big I. Matthews)
Gia Sandri
Luciano Benetti as Deputy sheriff (as Lucky Bennett)
Gabriella Giorgelli as Rosa (saloon dancer)
Ariel Brown
Renato Chiantoni
Franco Gulà
Romano Giomini
Julián Marcos

Plot
During a cattle drive Mike Jordan finds his father and brothers murdered and the herd stolen. He is met with suspicion by the local sheriff and population. Eventually, Mike is able to expose the rancher Barret as the perpetrator. He is assisted by Lisa, Barret's former sister-in-law, and Chris, a wanted horse thief.

Reception
In his investigation of narrative structures in Spaghetti Western films, Fridlund discusses Stranger in Sacramento among films that mix some characters, motifs and plots well known from American traditional Westerns with others usual in  Spaghetti Westerns. For example, Mike Jordan is close to the typical American Western hero, while Chris is more like Joe in A Fistful of Dollars.

References

External links
 

1965 films
1960s Italian-language films
Italian Western (genre) films
Spaghetti Western films
1965 Western (genre) films
Films directed by Sergio Bergonzelli
Films based on Western (genre) novels
Films produced by Sergio Bergonzelli
Films with screenplays by Sergio Bergonzelli
1960s Italian films